Tuchyňa is a village and municipality in Ilava District in the Trenčín Region of north-western Slovakia.

History
In historical records the village was first mentioned in 1243.

Geography
The municipality lies at an altitude of 275 metres and covers an area of 5.444 km². It has a population of about 779 people.

External links
  Official page
http://www.statistics.sk/mosmis/eng/run.html

Villages and municipalities in Ilava District